The State Correctional Institution – Graterford, commonly referred to as SCI Graterford, known prior as Eastern Correctional Institution, Graterford Prison, Graterford Penitentiary, and the Graterford Prison Farm, was a Pennsylvania Department of Corrections prison located in Skippack Township, Montgomery County, Pennsylvania, near Graterford.

The prison, described by Joseph Stefano of The Philadelphia Inquirer as the primary state prison serving the Philadelphia metropolitan area, once housed a small number of male death row inmates. Graterford closed in 2018 and was replaced by SCI Phoenix.

History 
The facility, built in 1929, was Pennsylvania's largest maximum-security prison, holding about 3,500 prisoners. It replaced functions at Eastern State Penitentiary in Philadelphia, which had previously experienced some disturbances.

An $80 million construction program completed in 1989 added a new administration building, a 28-bed infirmary, and 372 additional cells.

As recently as 1978 the prison held only about 1,600 prisoners in 2,000 available cells distributed among five major cellblocks of 400 cells each. The five major cellblocks were supplemented by about 40 cells in a security unit known as BAU (Behavior Adjustment Unit) or RHU (Restricted Housing Unit); this unit included a special death row section (though executions were never carried out at this prison). The original 1929 plan for the facility included eight major cellblocks of 400 cells each, or 3,200 individual cells. An engraving of this plan is found on a brass plaque just inside the facility's double-gated airlock-type main entrance.

The prison's two current Restricted Housing Units (RHU) are essentially prisons within a prison and house over 300 prisoners — about 10 percent of the total prison population - who are allowed one hour a day for exercise, remaining confined to their cells the other 23, where they receive three meals a day and are permitted shower visits. The prisoners in RHU are allowed only one visitor per month. SCI-Graterford has a 22-bed Mental Health Unit contracted to MHM Services to facilitate a mental health program.

SCI-Graterford Industries provides work and economic activity within the prison, including a garment factory, undergarment factory, shoe factory, weave plant, hosiery factory, carton factory, and a mail distribution center. Prison factories and industries employ 21 civilian staff, 315 inmate staff, and in 20032004 generated revenues of $4,450,940.01. The prison also conducts farming operations and educational programs.

In the final period of operations, Cynthia Link, the superintendent of Graterford and the prospective superintendent of Graterford's replacement facility, SCI Phoenix, resigned and retired. Laurel Harry, previously the superintendent of SCI Camp Hill, became the interim superintendent.

SCI Phoenix opened in July 2018. The state began moving Graterford prisoners there on July 11, 2018, and Graterford ended operations on July 15, 2018. All Graterford employees became Phoenix employees. Some inmates disliked the move as they feared they would be sharing cells with other inmates, while at Graterford they had single cells. The population of Graterford was reduced so the transfer of inmates to Phoenix would not involve as many people.

Programs 
Graterford had a music program for inmates, Songs in the Key of Free, run by volunteers and established in October 2016. A previous musical program ended around 2006. The program ended on May 21, 2018 as a result of Graterford's closure. In addition the stress-reduction and therapy programs from Rutgers University professor Nancy Wolff were also terminated as part of the move.

Notable inmates 
 George Feigley, sex cult leader, was imprisoned at Graterford from 1979-1981. He was transferred to Western Penitentiary after plans for him to escape by helicopter were unearthed.
 Bernard Hopkins, future boxing champion, spent several years at Graterford before beginning his boxing career.
Meek Mill, popular Philadelphia-native rapper, served time at Graterford from 2017-2018.

References

External links 

  - Pennsylvania Department of Corrections
  - Pennsylvania Department of Corrections
 Songs in the Key of Free music program
 interactive aerial perspective photograph

Graterford
Buildings and structures in Montgomery County, Pennsylvania
Capital punishment in Pennsylvania
1929 establishments in Pennsylvania
2018 disestablishments in Pennsylvania